United States v. Moylan, 417 F.2d 1002, 1003 (4th Cir. 1969), was a United States Court of Appeals for the Fourth Circuit case affirming a district court's refusal to permit defense counsel to argue for jury nullification.

Background
At 12:50 P.M. on May 17, 1968, Mary Moylan and seven others entered the office of the local draft board in Catonsville, Maryland, removed approximately 378 files, and took them to an adjacent parking lot where they burned the files with homemade napalm. They admitted committing these acts as a protest against the war in Vietnam. They were indicted, tried, and convicted in Federal district court and then appealed the conviction to the Fourth Circuit Court of Appeals.

The appellants based their appeal on asserted errors in the trial court's instructions to the jury. Their two claims were:

(1) The trial court erred on the definition of criminal intent and the meaning of "willfully"; they argued for a more expansive interpretation of the word "willful" i.e. that no violation occurred unless defendants performed the admitted acts with a bad purpose or motive. Since they acted from good motives (to protest a war which they sincerely believed was not only illegal but immoral) they could not have "willfully" violated the statutes.

(2) The trial judge should have informed the jury that it had the power to acquit the defendants even if they were clearly guilty of the offenses under the letter of the law, or at least the court should have permitted their attorney to explain that to the jury.

Decision
The appeals court issued its decision on October 15, 1969 by a unanimous 3-0 majority, with Judge Sobeloff giving the majority opinion affirming the district court's conviction.

They rejected the first claim:

They also rejected the second claim. While conceding that the jury has the absolute power to acquit even if that verdict is contrary to the law and evidence, informing the jury that they have that power is neither necessary nor desirable:

See also
 Sparf and Hansen v. United States

See also
Jury nullification

References

External links
 

 United States v. Moylan, 417 F.2d 1002 | Casetext Search + Citator

1969 in United States case law
United States jury case law
Jury nullification